ASK Karditsas B.C. (Greek: Α.Σ.Κ. Καρδίτσας K.A.E.), is a Greek professional basketball club that is based in Karditsa, Greece. The club's full name is Athlitikos Syllogos Karditsas (Αθλητικός Σύλλογος Καρδίτσας), which is also abbreviated as A.S.K. (Α.Σ.Κ), or A.S. Kardistas (Α.Σ. Καρδίτσας). The club's colors are white and blue.

History
ASK Karditsas was founded in its current form in 2006, as a result of a merger between the clubs Α.S. Karditsas 21st Century and Amila Karditsas. Α.S. Karditsas 21st Century and Amila Karditsas were themselves formed from earlier mergers. Α.S. Karditsas 21st Century was formed from a merger between Aiada Karditsas and Sports Club Karditsas, while Amila Karditsas was formed from a merger between G.S. Karditsas (where the well-known Greek player Giannis Bourousis began playing youth team basketball), Anagennisi Karditsas, and Amila Karditsas. As a result, it is generally considered that the present club incorporates the history and tradition of all of the previous clubs.

The club played in the 4th-tier level Greek C Basket League, during the 2014–15 season. The club was promoted up to the third-tier level Greek B Basket League, for the 2016–17 season. The club was then promoted up to the 2nd-tier level Greek A2 Basket League, for the 2017–18 season.

Karditsa won the Greek 2nd Division's 2021–22 season championship. Thus, they were promoted up to the top-tier level Greek Basket League, for the 2022–23 season.

Arenas
During the Greek 2nd Division's 2019–20 season, the club moved into the Giannis Bourousis Karditsa New Indoor Arena, which including collapsible seats, has a total seating capacity of 3,007 people.

Season by season

Honors and titles

Domestic competitions
Greek 2nd Division Champion: (1)
(2021–22)
Greek 4th Division Runner-up: (1)
(2015–16)
Greek 3rd Division Runner-up: (1)
(2016–17)

Roster

Depth chart

Notable players

  Giannis Bourousis
  Costis Gontikas
  Dimitris Gravas
  Nikos Kalles
  Theodoros Karras
  Thomas Kottas
  Spyros Magkounis
  Alexis Spyridonidis
  Theodoros Tsiloulis
  Dimitrios Verginis
  Milovan Drašković
  Stefan Đorđević
  Javin DeLaurier
  James Batemon III

Head coaches

References

External links
Official Website 
Greek Basket League Team Profile 
Eurobasket.com Team Profile

ASK Karditsas B.C.
2006 establishments in Greece
Basketball teams established in 2006
Basketball teams in Greece